Vitamin D is a group of fat-soluble secosteroids responsible for increasing intestinal absorption of calcium, magnesium, and phosphate, and many other biological effects. In humans, the most important compounds in this group are vitamin D3 (cholecalciferol) and vitamin D2 (ergocalciferol).

The major natural source of the vitamin is synthesis of cholecalciferol in the lower layers of epidermis of the skin through a chemical reaction that is dependent on sun exposure (specifically UVB radiation). Cholecalciferol and ergocalciferol can be ingested from the diet and supplements. Only a few foods, such as the flesh of fatty fish, naturally contain significant amounts of vitamin D. In the U.S. and other countries, cow's milk and plant-derived milk substitutes are fortified with vitamin D, as are many breakfast cereals. Mushrooms exposed to ultraviolet light contribute useful amounts of vitamin D2. Dietary recommendations typically assume that all of a person's vitamin D is taken by mouth, because sun exposure in the population is variable and recommendations about the amount of sun exposure that is safe are uncertain in view of the skin cancer risk.

Vitamin D from the diet, or from skin synthesis, is biologically inactive. It is activated by two protein enzyme hydroxylation steps, the first in the liver and the second in the kidneys. Because vitamin D can be synthesized in adequate amounts by most mammals if they get enough sunlight, it is not essential and therefore is technically not a vitamin. Instead it can be considered a hormone, with activation of the vitamin D pro-hormone resulting in the active form, calcitriol, which then produces effects via a nuclear receptor in multiple locations.

Cholecalciferol is converted in the liver to calcifediol (25-hydroxycholecalciferol); ergocalciferol is converted to 25-hydroxyergocalciferol. These two vitamin D metabolites (called 25-hydroxyvitamin D or 25(OH)D) are measured in serum to determine a person's vitamin D status. Calcifediol is further hydroxylated by the kidneys and some of the immune system cells to form calcitriol (1,25-dihydroxycholecalciferol), the biologically active form of vitamin D. Calcitriol circulates as a hormone in the blood, having a major role regulating the concentration of calcium and phosphate, and promoting the healthy growth and remodeling of bone. Calcitriol also has other effects, including some on cell growth, neuromuscular and immune functions, and reduction of inflammation.

Vitamin D has a significant role in calcium homeostasis and metabolism. Its discovery was due to effort to find the dietary substance lacking in children with rickets (the childhood form of osteomalacia). Vitamin D supplements are given to treat or to prevent osteomalacia and rickets. The evidence for other health effects of vitamin D supplementation in vitamin D–replete individuals is inconsistent. The effect of vitamin D supplementation on mortality is not clear, with one meta-analysis finding a small decrease in mortality in elderly people. Except for the prevention of rickets and osteomalacia in high-risk groups, any benefit of vitamin D supplements to musculoskeletal or general health may be small.

Types

Several forms (vitamers) of vitamin D exist. The two major forms are vitamin D2 or ergocalciferol, and vitamin D3 or cholecalciferol. Vitamin D without a subscript refers to either D2 or D3, or both, and is known collectively as calciferol.

Vitamin D2 was chemically characterized in 1931. In 1935, the chemical structure of vitamin D3 was defined and shown to result from the ultraviolet irradiation of 7-dehydrocholesterol. A chemical nomenclature for vitamin D forms was recommended in 1981, but alternative names remain in common use.

Chemically, the various forms of vitamin D are secosteroids, that is, steroids in which one of the bonds in the steroid rings is broken. The structural difference between vitamin D2 and vitamin D3 is in the side chain, which contains a double bond, between carbons 22 and 23, and a methyl group on carbon 24 in vitamin D2. Many vitamin D analogues have been synthesized.

Biology 

The active vitamin D metabolite calcitriol mediates its biological effects by binding to the vitamin D receptor (VDR), which is principally located in the nuclei of target cells. The binding of calcitriol to the VDR allows the VDR to act as a transcription factor that modulates the gene expression of transport proteins (such as TRPV6 and calbindin), which are involved in calcium absorption in the intestine. The vitamin D receptor belongs to the nuclear receptor superfamily of steroid/thyroid hormone receptors, and VDRs are expressed by cells in most organs, including the brain, heart, skin, gonads, prostate and breast.

VDR activation in the intestine, bone, kidney, and parathyroid gland cells leads to the maintenance of calcium and phosphorus levels in the blood (with the assistance of parathyroid hormone and calcitonin) and to the maintenance of bone content.

One of the most important roles of vitamin D is to maintain skeletal calcium balance by promoting calcium absorption in the intestines, promoting bone resorption by increasing osteoclast number, maintaining calcium and phosphate levels for bone formation, and allowing proper functioning of parathyroid hormone to maintain serum calcium levels. Vitamin D deficiency can result in lower bone mineral density and an increased risk of reduced bone density (osteoporosis) or bone fracture because a lack of vitamin D alters mineral metabolism in the body. Thus, vitamin D is also critical for bone remodeling through its role as a potent stimulator of bone resorption.

The VDR regulates cell proliferation and differentiation. Vitamin D also affects the immune system, and VDRs are expressed in several white blood cells, including monocytes and activated T and B cells. In vitro, vitamin D increases expression of the tyrosine hydroxylase gene in adrenal medullary cells, and affects the synthesis of neurotrophic factors, nitric oxide synthase, and glutathione.

Vitamin D receptor expression decreases with age.

Deficiency 

A diet with insufficient vitamin D in conjunction with inadequate sun exposure causes vitamin D deficiency, which is defined as a blood 25(OH)D level below 12ng/ml (30nmol/liter), whereas vitamin D insufficiency is a blood 25(OH)D level of 12-20ng/ml (30-50nmol/liter). An estimated one billion adults worldwide are either vitamin D insufficient or deficient, including in developed countries in Europe. Severe vitamin D deficiency in children, a rare disease in the developed world, causes a softening and weakening of growing bones, and a condition called rickets.

Vitamin D deficiency is found worldwide in the elderly and remains common in children and adults. Deficiency results in impaired bone mineralization and bone damage which leads to bone-softening diseases, including rickets in children and osteomalacia in adults. Low blood calcifediol (25-hydroxy-vitamin D) can result from avoiding the sun. Being deficient in vitamin D can cause intestinal absorption of dietary calcium to fall to 15%. When not deficient, an individual usually absorbs between 60 and 80%.

Dark-skinned people living in temperate climates have been shown to have low vitamin D levels. Dark-skinned people are less efficient at making vitamin D because melanin in the skin hinders vitamin D synthesis. Vitamin D deficiency is common in Hispanic and African-Americans in the United States, with levels dropping significantly in the winter. This is due to the levels of melanin in the skin, as it acts as a natural protectant from sun exposure.

Bone health

Rickets 

Rickets, a childhood disease, is characterized by impeded growth and soft, weak, deformed long bones that bend and bow under their weight as children start to walk. Rickets typically appears between 3 and 18 months of age. Cases continue to be reported in North American and other Western Countries and is primarily seen in breastfed infants and those with darker skin complexions. This condition is characterized by bow legs, which can be caused by calcium or phosphorus deficiency, as well as a lack of vitamin D; in the 21st century, it is largely found in low-income countries in Africa, Asia, or the Middle East and in those with genetic disorders such as pseudovitamin D deficiency rickets.

Maternal vitamin D deficiency may cause overt bone disease from before birth and impairment of bone quality after birth. Nutritional rickets exists in countries with intense year-round sunlight such as Nigeria and can occur without vitamin D deficiency.

Although rickets and osteomalacia are now rare in the United Kingdom, outbreaks have happened in some immigrant communities in which people with osteomalacia included women with seemingly adequate daylight outdoor exposure wearing Western clothing. Having darker skin and reduced exposure to sunshine did not produce rickets unless the diet deviated from a Western omnivore pattern characterized by high intakes of meat, fish, and eggs. The dietary risk factors for rickets include abstaining from animal foods.

Vitamin D deficiency remains the main cause of rickets among young infants in most countries because breast milk is low in vitamin D and social customs and climatic conditions can prevent adequate sun exposure. In sunny countries such as Nigeria, South Africa, and Bangladesh, where rickets occurs among older toddlers and children, it has been attributed to low dietary calcium intakes, which are characteristic of cereal-based diets with limited access to dairy products.

Rickets was formerly a major public health problem among the US population. In Denver, almost two-thirds of 500 children had mild rickets in the late 1920s. An increase in the proportion of animal protein in the 20th century American diet coupled with increased consumption of milk fortified with relatively small quantities of vitamin D coincided with a dramatic decline in the number of rickets cases. Also, in the United States and Canada, vitamin D-fortified milk, infant vitamin supplements, and vitamin supplements have helped to eradicate the majority of cases of rickets for children with fat malabsorption conditions.

Osteomalacia and osteoporosis

Osteomalacia is a disease in adults that results from vitamin D deficiency. Characteristics of this disease are softening of the bones, leading to bending of the spine, proximal muscle weakness, bone fragility, and increased risk for fractures. Osteomalacia reduces calcium absorption and increases calcium loss from bone, which increases the risk for bone fractures. Osteomalacia is usually present when 25-hydroxyvitamin D levels are less than about 10ng/mL. Although the effects of osteomalacia are thought to contribute to chronic musculoskeletal pain, there is no persuasive evidence of lower vitamin D levels in chronic pain sufferers or that supplementation alleviates chronic nonspecific musculoskeletal pain. Osteomalacia progress to osteoporosis, a condition of reduced bone mineral density with increased bone fragility and risk of bone fractures. Osteoporosis can be a long-term effect of calcium and/or vitamin D insufficiency, the latter contributing by reducing calcium absorption.

Use of supplements 
Supplementation with vitamin D is a reliable method for preventing or treating rickets. The effects of vitamin D supplementation on non-skeletal health are uncertain. A review did not find any effect from supplementation on the rates of non-skeletal disease, other than a tentative decrease in mortality in the elderly. Vitamin D supplements do not alter the outcomes for myocardial infarction, stroke or cerebrovascular disease, cancer, bone fractures or knee osteoarthritis.

A US Institute of Medicine (IOM) report states: "Outcomes related to cancer, cardiovascular disease and hypertension, and diabetes and metabolic syndrome, falls and physical performance, immune functioning and autoimmune disorders, infections, neuropsychological functioning, and preeclampsia could not be linked reliably with calcium or vitamin D intake and were often conflicting." Some researchers claim the IOM was too definitive in its recommendations and made a mathematical mistake when calculating the blood level of vitamin D associated with bone health. Members of the IOM panel maintain that they used a "standard procedure for dietary recommendations" and that the report is solidly based on the data.

Mortality, all-causes 
Vitamin D3 supplementation has been tentatively found to lead to a reduced risk of death in the elderly, but the effect has not been deemed pronounced, or certain enough, to make taking supplements recommendable. Other forms (vitamin D2, alfacalcidol, and calcitriol) do not appear to have any beneficial effects with regard to the risk of death. High blood levels appear to be associated with a lower risk of death, but it is unclear if supplementation can result in this benefit. Both an excess and a deficiency in vitamin D appear to cause abnormal functioning and premature aging. The relationship between serum calcifediol concentrations and all-cause mortality is "U-shaped": mortality is elevated at high and low calcifediol levels, relative to moderate levels. Harm from vitamin D appears to occur at a lower vitamin D level in the black population than in the white population.

Bone health 
In general, no good evidence supports the commonly held belief that vitamin D supplements can help prevent osteoporosis. Its general use for prevention of this disease in those without vitamin D deficiency is thus likely not needed. For older people with osteoporosis, taking vitamin D with calcium may help prevent hip fractures, but it also slightly increases the risk of stomach and kidney problems. A study found that supplementation with 800 IU or more daily, in those older than 65 years was "somewhat favorable in the prevention of hip fracture and non-vertebral fracture". The effect is small or none for people living independently. Low serum vitamin D levels have been associated with falls, and low bone mineral density. Taking extra vitamin D, however, does not appear to change the risk.

Athletes who are vitamin D deficient are at an increased risk of stress fractures and/or major breaks, particularly those engaging in contact sports. The greatest benefit with supplementation is seen in athletes who are deficient (25(OH)D serum levels <30ng/mL), or severely deficient (25(OH)D serum levels <25ng/mL). Incremental decreases in risks are observed with rising serum 25(OH)D concentrations plateauing at 50ng/mL with no additional benefits seen in levels beyond this point.

A 2020 Cochrane systematic review has found limited evidence that vitamin D plus calcium, but not independently can improve healing in children with nutritional rickets, but the evidence was not conclusive for reducing fractures.

The US Food and Drug Administration (FDA) has required manufacturers to declare the amount of vitamin D on nutrition facts labels, as "nutrients of public health significance", since May 2016. By a proposed deadline extension, some manufacturers had until 1 July 2021, to comply.

Cancer 
Potential associations have been found between low vitamin D levels and the risk of developing several types of cancer. Meta-analyses of observational studies have found reduced risk of cancer incidence related to vitamin D intake and 25(OH)D levels, particularly for colorectal cancer, although the strength of the associations was classified as weak. While randomized controlled trials have not confirmed that vitamin D supplements reduce the risk of cancer incidence, the relative risk of cancer deaths was lower by up to 16% in several meta-analyses.

Cardiovascular disease 

Vitamin D supplementation is not associated with a reduced risk of stroke, cerebrovascular disease, myocardial infarction, or ischemic heart disease. Supplementation does not lower blood pressure in the general population.

Immune system

Infectious diseases 
In general, vitamin D functions to activate the innate and dampen the adaptive immune systems with antibacterial, antiviral and anti-inflammatory effects. Low levels of vitamin D appear to be a risk factor for tuberculosis, and historically it was used as a treatment.

Vitamin D supplementation in low doses (400 to 1000 IU/day) may slightly decrease the overall risk of acute respiratory tract infections. The benefits were found in young children and adolescents (ages 1 up to 16 years) and were not confirmed with higher doses (>1000 IU per day or more). Vitamin D supplementation substantially reduces the rate of moderate or severe exacerbations of COPD in people with baseline 25(OH)D levels under 25nmol/L, but not in those with less severe deficiency.

Asthma 
Vitamin D supplementation does not help prevent asthma attacks or alleviate their symptoms.

Inflammatory bowel disease 
Low levels of vitamin D are associated with two major forms of human inflammatory bowel disease (IBD): Crohn's disease and ulcerative colitis. A meta-analysis of vitamin D therapy in people with inflammatory bowel disease and vitamin D deficiency has shown that supplementation is effective at correcting vitamin D levels and is associated with improvements in scores for clinical disease activity and biochemical markers.

Other conditions

Diabetes
A meta-analysis reported that vitamin D supplementation significantly reduced the risk of type 2 diabetes for non-obese people with prediabetes. Another meta-analysis reported that vitamin D supplementation significantly improved glycemic control [homeostatic model assessment-insulin resistance (HOMA-IR)], hemoglobin A1C (HbA1C), and fasting blood glucose (FBG) in individuals with type 2 diabetes. In prospective studies, high versus low level of vitamin D was respectively associated with significant decrease in risk of type 2 diabetes, combined type 2 diabetes and prediabetes, and prediabetes. A 2011 Cochrane systematic review examined one study that showed vitamin D together with insulin maintained levels of fasting C-peptide after 12 months better than insulin alone. However, it is important to highlight that the studies available to be included in this review presented considerable flaws in quality and design.

Attention deficit hyperactivity disorder (ADHD)  
A meta-analysis of observational studies showed that children with  ADHD have lower vitamin D levels, and that there was a small association between low vitamin D levels at the time of birth and later development of ADHD. Several small, randomized controlled trials of vitamin D supplementation indicated improved ADHD symptoms such as impulsivity and hyperactivity.

Depression
Clinical trials of vitamin D supplementation for depressive symptoms have generally been of low quality and show no overall effect, although subgroup analysis showed supplementation for participants with clinically significant depressive symptoms or depressive disorder had a moderate effect.

Cognition and dementia 
A systematic review of clinical studies found an association between low vitamin D levels with cognitive impairment and a higher risk of developing Alzheimer's disease. However, lower vitamin D concentrations are also associated with poor nutrition and spending less time outdoors. Therefore, alternative explanations for the increase in cognitive impairment exist and hence a direct causal relationship between vitamin D levels and cognition could not be established.

Schizophrenia
Trials have demonstrated lower vitamin D levels are highly prevalent in people with schizophrenia, particularly those with acute episodes.

Pregnancy
Low levels of vitamin D in pregnancy are associated with gestational diabetes, pre-eclampsia, and small (for gestational age) infants. Although taking vitamin D supplements during pregnancy raises blood levels of vitamin D in the mother at term, the full extent of benefits for the mother or baby is unclear. Pregnant women who take an adequate amount of vitamin D during gestation may experience a lower risk of pre-eclampsia and positive immune effects. Vitamin D supplementation is also likely to reduce the risk of gestational diabetes, undersized babies and of their poor rate of growth. Pregnant women often do not take the recommended amount of vitamin D.

Weight loss
Though hypothesized that vitamin D supplementation may be an effective treatment for obesity apart from calorie restriction, one systematic review found no association of supplementation with body weight or fat mass. A 2016 meta-analysis found that circulating vitamin D status was improved by weight loss, indicating that fat mass may be inversely associated with blood levels of vitamin D.

Allowable health claims 
Governmental regulatory agencies stipulate for the food and dietary supplement industries certain health claims as allowable as statements on packaging.

European Food Safety Authority
 normal function of the immune system
 normal inflammatory response
 normal muscle function
 reduced risk of falling in people over age 60

US Food and Drug Administration (FDA)
 "Adequate calcium and vitamin D, as part of a well balanced diet, along with physical activity, may reduce the risk of osteoporosis."

Health Canada
 "Adequate calcium and regular exercise may help to achieve strong bones in children and adolescents and may reduce the risk of osteoporosis in older adults. An adequate intake of vitamin D is also necessary."

Other possible agencies with claim guidance: Japan FOSHU and Australia-New Zealand.

Dietary intake

Recommended levels
Various institutions have proposed different recommendations for the amount of daily intake of vitamin D. These vary according to precise definition, age, pregnancy or lactation, and the extent assumptions are made regarding skin synthesis of vitamin D.
Conversion: 1μg (microgram) = 40IU (international unit).

United Kingdom
The UK National Health Service (NHS) recommends that people at risk of vitamin D deficiency, breast-fed babies, formula-fed babies taking less than 500ml/day, and children aged 6 months to 4 years, should take daily vitamin D supplements throughout the year to ensure sufficient intake. This includes people with limited skin synthesis of vitamin D, who are not often outdoors, are frail, housebound, living in a care home, or usually wearing clothes that cover up most of the skin, or with dark skin, such as having an African, African-Caribbean or south Asian background. Other people may be able to make adequate vitamin D from sunlight exposure from April to September. The NHS and Public Health England recommend that everyone, including those who are pregnant and breastfeeding, consider taking a daily supplement containing 10μg (400 IU) of vitamin D during autumn and winter because of inadequate sunlight for vitamin D synthesis.

United States 
The dietary reference intake for vitamin D issued in 2010 by the Institute of Medicine (IoM) (renamed National Academy of Medicine in 2015), superseded previous recommendations which were expressed in terms of adequate intake. The recommendations were formed assuming the individual has no skin synthesis of vitamin D because of inadequate sun exposure. The reference intake for vitamin D refers to total intake from food, beverages and supplements, and assumes that calcium requirements are being met. The tolerable upper intake level (UL) is defined as "the highest average daily intake of a nutrient that is likely to pose no risk of adverse health effects for nearly all persons in the general population." Although ULs are believed to be safe, information on the long-term effects is incomplete and these levels of intake are not recommended for long-term consumption.

For US food and dietary supplement labeling purposes, the amount in a serving is expressed as a percent of Daily Value (%DV). For vitamin D labeling purposes, 100% of the daily value was 400IU (10μg), but in May 2016, it was revised to 800IU (20μg) to bring it into agreement with the recommended dietary allowance (RDA). A table of the old and new adult daily values is provided at Reference Daily Intake.

Canada 
Health Canada published recommended dietary intakes (DRIs) and tolerable upper intake levels (ULs) for vitamin D based on the jointly commissioned and funded Institute of Medicine 2010 report.

Australia and New Zealand 
Australia and New Zealand published nutrient reference values including guidelines for dietary vitamin D intake in 2006. About a third of Australians have vitamin D deficiency.

European Union
The European Food Safety Authority (EFSA) in 2016 reviewed the current evidence, finding the relationship between serum 25(OH)D concentration and musculoskeletal health outcomes is widely variable. They considered that average requirements and population reference intakes values for vitamin D cannot be derived, and that a serum 25(OH)D concentration of 50nmol/L was a suitable target value. For all people over the age of 1, including women who are pregnant or lactating, they set an adequate intake of 15μg/day (600IU).

The EFSA reviewed safe levels of intake in 2012, setting the tolerable upper limit for adults at 100μg/day (4000IU), a similar conclusion as the IOM.

The Swedish National Food Agency recommends a daily intake of 10μg (400IU) of vitamin D3 for children and adults up to 75 years, and 20μg (800IU) for adults 75 and older.

Non-government organisations in Europe have made their own recommendations. The German Society for Nutrition recommends 20μg. The European Menopause and Andropause Society recommends postmenopausal women consume 15μg (600IU) until age 70, and 20μg (800IU) from age 71. This dose should be increased to 100μg (4,000IU) in some patients with very low vitamin D status or in case of co-morbid conditions.

Sources 
Although vitamin D is present naturally in only a few foods, it is commonly added as a fortification in manufactured foods. In some countries, staple foods are artificially fortified with vitamin D.

Natural sources 

In general, vitamin D3 is found in animal source foods, particularly fish, meat, offal, egg and dairy.
Vitamin D2 is found in fungi and is produced by ultraviolet irradiation of ergosterol. The vitamin D2 content in mushrooms and Cladina arbuscula, a lichen, increases with exposure to ultraviolet light, and is stimulated by industrial ultraviolet lamps for fortification. The United States Department of Agriculture reports D2 and D3 content combined in one value.

Food fortification 
Manufactured foods fortified with vitamin D include some fruit juices and fruit juice drinks, meal replacement energy bars, soy protein-based beverages, certain cheese and cheese products, flour products, infant formulas, many breakfast cereals, and milk.

In 2016 in the United States, the Food and Drug Administration (FDA) amended food additive regulations for milk fortification, stating that vitamin D3 levels not exceed 42IU vitamin D per 100g (400IU per US quart) of dairy milk, 84IU of vitamin D2 per 100g (800IU per quart) of plant milks, and 89IU per 100g (800IU per quart) in plant-based yogurts or in soy beverage products. Plant milks are defined as beverages made from soy, almond, rice, among other plant sources intended as alternatives to dairy milk.

While some studies have found that vitamin D3 raises 25(OH)D blood levels faster and remains active in the body longer, others contend that vitamin D2 sources are equally bioavailable and effective as D3 for raising and sustaining 25(OH)D.

Food preparation 
Vitamin D content in typical foods is reduced variably by cooking. Boiled, fried and baked foods retained 6989% of original vitamin D.

Recommended serum levels 

Recommendations on recommended 25(OH)D serum levels vary across authorities, and vary based on factors like age. US labs generally report 25(OH)D levels in ng/mL. Other countries often use nmol/L. Oneng/mL is approximately equal to 2.5nmol/L.

A 2014 review concluded that the most advantageous serum levels for 25(OH)D for all outcomes appeared to be close to 30ng/mL (75nmol/L). The optimal vitamin D levels are still controversial and another review concluded that ranges from 30 to 40ng/mL (75 to 100nmol/L) were to be recommended for athletes. Part of the controversy is because numerous studies have found differences in serum levels of 25(OH)D between ethnic groups; studies point to genetic as well as environmental reasons behind these variations. Supplementation to achieve these standard levels could cause harmful vascular calcification.

A 2012 meta-analysis showed that the risk of cardiovascular diseases increases when blood levels of vitamin D are lowest in a range of 8 to 24ng/mL (20 to 60nmol/L), although results among the studies analyzed were inconsistent.

In 2011 an IOM committee concluded a serum 25(OH)D level of 20ng/mL (50nmol/L) is needed for bone and overall health. The dietary reference intakes for vitamin D are chosen with a margin of safety and 'overshoot' the targeted serum value to ensure the specified levels of intake achieve the desired serum 25(OH)D levels in almost all persons. No contributions to serum 25(OH)D level are assumed from sun exposure and the recommendations are fully applicable to people with dark skin or negligible exposure to sunlight. The Institute found serum 25(OH)D concentrations above 30ng/mL (75nmol/L) are "not consistently associated with increased benefit". Serum 25(OH)D levels above 50ng/mL (125nmol/L) may be cause for concern. However, some people with serum 25(OH)D between 30 and 50ng/mL (75nmol/L-125nmol/L) will also have inadequate vitamin D.

Excess 

Vitamin D toxicity is rare. It is caused by supplementing with high doses of vitamin D rather than sunlight. The threshold for vitamin D toxicity has not been established; however, according to some research, the tolerable upper intake level (UL) is 4,000 IU/day for ages 9–71 (100μg/day), while other research concludes that, in healthy adults, sustained intake of more than 50,000IU/day (1250μg) can produce overt toxicity after several months and can increase serum 25-hydroxyvitamin D levels to 150ng/mL and greater. Those with certain medical conditions, such as primary hyperparathyroidism, are far more sensitive to vitamin D and develop hypercalcemia in response to any increase in vitamin D nutrition, while maternal hypercalcemia during pregnancy may increase fetal sensitivity to effects of vitamin D and lead to a syndrome of intellectual disability and facial deformities.

Idiopathic infantile hypercalcemia is caused by a mutation of the CYP24A1 gene, leading to a reduction in the degradation of vitamin D. Infants who have such a mutation have an increased sensitivity to vitamin D and in case of additional intake a risk of hypercalcaemia. The disorder can continue into adulthood.

A review published in 2015 noted that adverse effects have been reported only at 25(OH)D serum concentrations above 200nmol/L.

Published cases of toxicity involving hypercalcemia in which the vitamin D dose and the 25-hydroxy-vitamin D levels are known all involve an intake of ≥40,000IU (1,000μg) per day.

Those who are pregnant or breastfeeding should consult a doctor before taking a vitamin D supplement. The FDA advised manufacturers of liquid vitamin D supplements that droppers accompanying these products should be clearly and accurately marked for 400 international units (1IU is the biological equivalent of 25ng cholecalciferol/ergocalciferol). In addition, for products intended for infants, the FDA recommends the dropper hold no more than 400IU. For infants (birth to 12 months), the tolerable upper limit (maximum amount that can be tolerated without harm) is set at 25μg/day (1,000IU). One thousand micrograms per day in infants has produced toxicity within one month. After being commissioned by the Canadian and American governments, the Institute of Medicine (IOM) , has increased the tolerable upper limit (UL) to 2,500IU per day for ages 1–3 years, 3,000IU per day for ages 4–8 years and 4,000IU per day for ages 9–71+ years (including pregnant or lactating women).

Calcitriol itself is auto-regulated in a negative feedback cycle, and is also affected by parathyroid hormone, fibroblast growth factor 23, cytokines, calcium, and phosphate.

A study published in 2017 assessed the prevalence of high daily intake levels of supplemental vitamin D among adults ages 20+ in the United States, based on publicly available NHANES data from 1999 through 2014. Its data shows the following:

 Over 18% of the population exceeds the NIH daily recommended allowance (RDA) of 600–800 IU, by taking over 1000 IU, which suggests intentional supplement intake.
 Over 3% of the population exceeds the NIH daily tolerable upper intake level (UL) of 4000 IU, above which level the risk of toxic effects increases.
 The percentage of the population taking over 1000 IU/day, as well as the percentage taking over 4000 IU/day, have both increased since 1999, according to trend analysis.

Effect of excess 
Vitamin D overdose causes hypercalcemia, which is a strong indication of vitamin D toxicity – this can be noted with an increase in urination and thirst. If hypercalcemia is not treated, it results in excess deposits of calcium in soft tissues and organs such as the kidneys, liver, and heart, resulting in pain and organ damage.

The main symptoms of vitamin D overdose are hypercalcemia including anorexia, nausea, and vomiting. These may be followed by polyuria, polydipsia, weakness, insomnia, nervousness, pruritus and ultimately kidney failure. Furthermore, proteinuria, urinary casts, azotemia, and metastatic calcification (especially in the kidneys) may develop. Other symptoms of vitamin D toxicity include intellectual disability in young children, abnormal bone growth and formation, diarrhea, irritability, weight loss, and severe depression.

Vitamin D toxicity is treated by discontinuing vitamin D supplementation and restricting calcium intake. Kidney damage may be irreversible. Exposure to sunlight for extended periods of time does not normally cause vitamin D toxicity. The concentrations of vitamin D precursors produced in the skin reach an equilibrium, and any further vitamin D produced is degraded.

Biosynthesis 
Synthesis of vitamin D in nature is dependent on the presence of UV radiation and subsequent activation in the liver and in the kidneys. Many animals synthesize vitamin D3 from 7-dehydrocholesterol, and many fungi synthesize vitamin D2 from ergosterol.

Interactive pathway
Click on icon in lower right corner to open.

Photochemistry 

The transformation that converts 7-dehydrocholesterol to vitamin D3 occurs in two steps. First, 7-dehydrocholesterol is photolyzed by ultraviolet light in a 6-electron conrotatory ring-opening electrocyclic reaction; the product is previtaminD3. Second, previtaminD3 spontaneously isomerizes to vitaminD3 (cholecalciferol) in an antarafacial sigmatropic [1,7] hydride shift. At room temperature, the transformation of previtaminD3 to vitamin D3 in an organic solvent takes about 12 days to complete. The conversion of previtaminD3 to vitamin D3 in the skin is about 10 times faster than in an organic solvent.

The conversion from ergosterol to vitamin D2 follows a similar procedure, forming previtaminD2 by photolysis, which isomerizes to vitamin D2 (ergocalciferol). The transformation of previtaminD2 to vitamin D2 in methanol has a rate comparable to that of previtaminD3. The process is faster in white button mushrooms.

Synthesis in the skin 

Vitamin D3 is produced photochemically from 7-dehydrocholesterol in the skin of most vertebrate animals, including humans. The precursor of vitamin D3, 7-dehydrocholesterol is produced in relatively large quantities. 7-Dehydrocholesterol reacts with UVB light at wavelengths of 290–315 nm. These wavelengths are present in sunlight, as well as in the light emitted by the UV lamps in tanning beds (which produce ultraviolet primarily in the UVA spectrum, but typically produce 4% to 10% of the total UV emissions as UVB, some tanning beds can use only separate UVB light bulbs specifically for vitamin production). Exposure to light through windows is insufficient because glass almost completely blocks UVB light.

Adequate amounts of vitamin D can be produced with moderate sun exposure to the face, arms and legs (for those with the least melanin), averaging 5–30 minutes twice per week, or approximately 25% of the time for minimal sunburn. The darker the skin and the weaker the sunlight, the more minutes of exposure are needed. Vitamin-D overdose is impossible from UV exposure: the skin reaches an equilibrium where the vitamin degrades as fast as it is created.

The skin consists of two primary layers: the inner layer called the dermis, and the outer, thinner epidermis. Vitamin D is produced in the keratinocytes of two innermost strata of the epidermis, the stratum basale and stratum spinosum, which also are able to produce calcitriol and express the VDR.

Evolution 
Vitamin D can be synthesized only by a photochemical process. Its production from sterols would have started very early in the evolution of life around the origin of photosynthesis, possibly helping to prevent DNA damage by absorbing UVB, making vitamin D an inactive end product. The familiar vitamin D endocrine machinery containing vitamin D receptor (VDR), various CYP450 enzymes for activation and inactivation, and a vitamin D binding protein (DBP) is found in vertebrates only. Primitive marine vertebrates are thought to absorb calcium from the ocean into their skeletons and eat plankton rich in vitamin D, although the function in those without a calcified cartilage is unclear. Phytoplankton in the ocean (such as coccolithophore and Emiliania huxleyi) have been photosynthesizing vitamin D for more than 500million years.

Land vertebrates required another source of vitamin D other than plants for their calcified skeletons. They had to either ingest it or be exposed to sunlight to photosynthesize it in their skin. Land vertebrates have been photosynthesizing vitamin D for more than 350million years.

In birds and fur-bearing mammals, fur or feathers block UV rays from reaching the skin. Instead, vitamin D is created from oily secretions of the skin deposited onto the feathers or fur, and is obtained orally during grooming. However, some animals, such as the naked mole-rat, are naturally cholecalciferol-deficient, as serum 25-OH vitamin D levels are undetectable. Dogs and cats are practically incapable of vitamin D synthesis due to high activity of 7-dehydrocholesterol reductase, but they do get the vitamin from prey animals.

Industrial synthesis
Vitamin D3 (cholecalciferol) is produced industrially by exposing 7-dehydrocholesterol to UVB and UVC light, followed by purification. The 7-dehydrocholesterol is a natural substance in fish organs, especially the liver, or in wool grease (lanolin) from sheep. Vitamin D2 (ergocalciferol) is produced in a similar way using ergosterol from yeast or mushrooms as a starting material.

Mechanism of action

Metabolic activation 

Vitamin D is carried via the blood to the liver, where it is converted into the prohormone calcifediol. Circulating calcifediol may then be converted into calcitriol  the biologically active form of vitamin D  in the kidneys.

Whether synthesized in the skin or ingested, vitamin D is hydroxylated in the liver at position 25 (upper right of the molecule) to form 25-hydroxycholecalciferol (calcifediol or 25(OH)D). This reaction is catalyzed by the microsomal enzyme vitamin D 25-hydroxylase, the product of the CYP2R1 human gene, and expressed by hepatocytes. Once made, the product is released into the plasma, where it is bound to an α-globulin carrier protein named the vitamin D-binding protein.

Calcifediol is transported to the proximal tubules of the kidneys, where it is hydroxylated at the 1-α position (lower right of the molecule) to form calcitriol (1,25-dihydroxycholecalciferol, 1,25(OH)2D). The conversion of calcifediol to calcitriol is catalyzed by the enzyme 25-hydroxyvitamin D3 1-alpha-hydroxylase, which is the product of the CYP27B1 human gene. The activity of CYP27B1 is increased by parathyroid hormone, and also by low calcium or phosphate. Following the final converting step in the kidney, calcitriol is released into the circulation. By binding to vitamin D-binding protein, calcitriol is transported throughout the body, including to the intestine, kidneys, and bones. Calcitriol is the most potent natural ligand of the vitamin D receptor, which mediates most of the physiological actions of vitamin D. In addition to the kidneys, calcitriol is also synthesized by certain other cells, including monocyte-macrophages in the immune system. When synthesized by monocyte-macrophages, calcitriol acts locally as a cytokine, modulating body defenses against microbial invaders by stimulating the innate immune system.

Inactivation 
The activity of calcifediol and calcitriol can be reduced by hydroxylation at position 24 by vitamin D3 24-hydroxylase, forming secalciferol and calcitetrol, respectively.

Difference between substrates 
VitaminD2 (ergocalciferol) and vitaminD3 (cholecalciferol) share a similar mechanism of action as outlined above. Metabolites produced by vitamin D2 are named with an er- or ergo- prefix to differentiate them from the D3-based counterparts (sometimes with a chole- prefix).
 Metabolites produced from vitaminD2 tend to bind less well to the vitamin D-binding protein.
 VitaminD3 can alternatively be hydroxylated to calcifediol by sterol 27-hydroxylase (CYP27A1), but vitaminD2 cannot.
 Ergocalciferol can be directly hydroxylated at position 24 by CYP27A1. This hydroxylation also leads to a greater degree of inactivation: the activity of calcitriol decreases to 60% of original after 24-hydroxylation, whereas ercalcitriol undergoes a 10-fold decrease in activity on conversion to ercalcitetrol.

It is disputed whether these differences lead to a measurable drop in efficacy (see ).

Intracellular mechanisms 

Calcitriol enters the target cell and binds to the vitamin D receptor in the cytoplasm. This activated receptor enters the nucleus and binds to vitamin D response elements (VDRE) which are specific DNA sequences on genes. Transcription of these genes is stimulated and produces greater levels of the proteins which mediate the effects of vitamin D.

Some reactions of the cell to calcitriol appear to be too fast for the classical VDRE transcription pathway, leading to the discovery of various non-genomic actions of vitamin D. The membrane-bound PDIA3 likely serves as an alternate receptor in this pathway. The classical VDR may still play a role.

History 

Vitamin D was discovered in 1922 following on from previous research. American researchers Elmer McCollum and Marguerite Davis in 1914 discovered a substance in cod liver oil which later was called "vitamin A". British doctor Edward Mellanby noticed dogs that were fed cod liver oil did not develop rickets and concluded vitamin A, or a closely associated factor, could prevent the disease. In 1922, Elmer McCollum tested modified cod liver oil in which the vitamin A had been destroyed. The modified oil cured the sick dogs, so McCollum concluded the factor in cod liver oil which cured rickets was distinct from vitamin A. He called it vitamin D because it was the fourth vitamin to be named. It was not initially realized that, unlike other vitamins, vitamin D can be synthesised by humans through exposure to UV light.

In 1925, it was established that when 7-dehydrocholesterol is irradiated with light, a form of a fat-soluble vitamin is produced (now known as D3). Alfred Fabian Hess stated: "Light equals vitamin D." Adolf Windaus, at the University of Göttingen in Germany, received the Nobel Prize in Chemistry in 1928 for his work on the constitution of sterols and their connection with vitamins. In 1929, a group at NIMR in Hampstead, London, were working on the structure of vitamin D, which was still unknown, as well as the structure of steroids. A meeting took place with J.B.S. Haldane, J.D. Bernal, and Dorothy Crowfoot to discuss possible structures, which contributed to bringing a team together. X-ray crystallography demonstrated the sterol molecules were flat, not as proposed by the German team led by Windaus. In 1932, Otto Rosenheim and Harold King published a paper putting forward structures for sterols and bile acids which found immediate acceptance. The informal academic collaboration between the team members Robert Benedict Bourdillon, Otto Rosenheim, Harold King, and Kenneth Callow was very productive and led to the isolation and characterization of vitamin D. At this time, the policy of the Medical Research Council was not to patent discoveries, believing the results of medical research should be open to everybody. In the 1930s, Windaus clarified further the chemical structure of vitamin D.

In 1923, American biochemist Harry Steenbock at the University of Wisconsin demonstrated that irradiation by ultraviolet light increased the vitamin D content of foods and other organic materials. After irradiating rodent food, Steenbock discovered the rodents were cured of rickets. Using  of his own money, Steenbock patented his invention. His irradiation technique was used for foodstuffs, most notably for milk. By the expiration of his patent in 1945, rickets had been all but eliminated in the US.

In 1969, a specific binding protein for vitamin D called the vitamin D receptor was identified. Shortly thereafter, the conversion of vitamin D to calcifediol and then to calcitriol, the biologically active form, was confirmed. The photosynthesis of vitamin D3 in skin via previtamin D3 and its subsequent metabolism was described in 1980.

Research
There is conflicting evidence about the benefits of interventions with vitamin D. Supplementation of between 800 and 1,000 IU is safe, but higher levels leading to blood levels of more than 50ng/ml (125nmol/l) may cause adverse effects.

The US Office of Dietary Supplements established a Vitamin D Initiative over 2004-18 to track current research and provide education to consumers. As of 2022, the role of vitamin D in the prevention and treatment of diabetes, glucose intolerance, hypertension, multiple sclerosis, and other medical conditions remains under preliminary research.

Some preliminary studies link low vitamin D levels with disease later in life. One meta-analysis found a decrease in mortality in elderly people. Another meta-analysis covering over 350,000 people concluded that vitamin D supplementation in unselected community-dwelling individuals does not reduce skeletal (total fracture) or non-skeletal outcomes (myocardial infarction, ischemic heart disease, stroke, cerebrovascular disease, cancer) by more than 15%, and that further research trials with similar design are unlikely to change these conclusions. As of 2022, there is insufficient evidence for an effect of vitamin D supplementation on the risk of cancer. A 2019 meta-analysis found a small increase in risk of stroke when calcium and vitamin D supplements were taken together.

COVID-19 

 the US National Institutes of Health state there is insufficient evidence to recommend for or against using vitamin D supplementation to prevent or treat COVID-19. The UK National Institute for Health and Care Excellence (NICE) does not recommend to offer a vitamin D supplement to people solely to prevent or treat COVID‑19. Both organizations included recommendations to continue the previous established recommendations on vitamin D supplementation for other reasons, such as bone and muscle health, as applicable. Both organizations noted that more people may require supplementation due to lower amounts of sun exposure during the pandemic.

Several systematic reviews and meta-analyses of multiple studies have described the associations of vitamin D deficiency with adverse outcomes in COVID-19. In the largest analysis, with data from 76 observational studies including almost two million adults, vitamin D deficiency or insufficiency significantly increased the susceptibility to becoming infected with COVID-19 and having severe COVID-19, with odds ratios of 1.5 and 1.9 respectively, but these findings had high risk of bias and heterogeneity. A two-fold greater mortality was found, but this analysis was less robust. These findings confirm smaller, earlier analyses, one of which, in reporting that people with COVID-19 tend to have lower 25(OH)D levels than healthy subjects, stated that the trend for associations with health outcomes was limited by the low quality of the studies and by the possibility of reverse causality mechanisms.

A meta-analysis of three studies on the effect of oral vitamin D or calcifediol supplementation indicated a lower intensive care unit (ICU) admission rate (odds ratio: 0.36) compared to those without supplementation, but without a change in mortality. A Cochrane review, also of three studies, found the evidence for the effectiveness of vitamin D supplementation for the treatment of COVID-19 to be very uncertain. They found there was substantial clinical and methodological heterogeneity in the three studies that were included, mainly because of different supplementation strategies, vitamin D formulations (one using calcifediol), pre-treatment status and reported outcomes. Another meta-analysis stated that the use of high doses of vitamin D in people with COVID-19 is not based on solid evidence although calcifediol supplementation may have a protective effect on ICU admissions.

References

External links 

 
Biomolecules
Sun tanning